The statue of Esteban de Antuñano is installed in the city of Puebla, Puebla, Mexico.

External links

 

Monuments and memorials in Puebla
Outdoor sculptures in Puebla (city)
Sculptures of men in Mexico
Statues in Puebla